Allophylus chartaceus (Kurz) Radlkofer is a plant species in the family Sapindaceae. It is native to China, India, and Bhutan.

The plant is a shrub with simple leaves, and inflorescences in pairs or groups rather than solitary. It produces fleshy red fruits up to 1 cm in diameter.

References 

chartaceus
Flora of China
Flora of India (region)
Flora of Bhutan